The 1975–76 Phoenix Roadrunners season was the second season of operation of the Phoenix Roadrunners in the World Hockey Association (WHA). The Roadrunners qualified for the playoffs but lost in the first round to the San Diego Mariners.

Offseason

Regular season

Final standings

Game log

Playoffs

San Diego Mariners 3, Phoenix Roadrunners 2 - Preliminary Round

Player stats

Note: Pos = Position; GP = Games played; G = Goals; A = Assists; Pts = Points; +/- = plus/minus; PIM = Penalty minutes; PPG = Power-play goals; SHG = Short-handed goals; GWG = Game-winning goals
      MIN = Minutes played; W = Wins; L = Losses; T = Ties; GA = Goals-against; GAA = Goals-against average; SO = Shutouts;

Awards and records

Transactions

Draft picks
Phoenix's draft picks at the 1975 WHA Amateur Draft.

Farm teams

See also
1975–76 WHA season

References

External links

Phoe
Phoe
Phoenix Roadrunners seasons